Eranina esquinas is a species of beetle in the family Cerambycidae. It was described by Galileo and Martins in 2008. It is known from Costa Rica.

References

Eranina
Beetles described in 2008